The 2021–22 CEV Women's Champions League was the 62nd edition of the highest level European volleyball club competition organised by the European Volleyball Confederation.

Qualification

Pools composition
Drawing of Lots was held on 24 September 2021 in Ljubljana.

League round
 20 teams compete in the league round
 The teams are split into 5 groups, each one featuring four teams
 Winner of each pool and best three second placed teams advance to the quarterfinals 

All times are local
Pool A

|}

|}

Pool B

|}

|}

Pool C

|}

|}

Pool D

|}

|}

Pool E

|}

|}

Second place ranking

|}

Playoffs
All times are local
Quarterfinals

|}

First leg

|}

Second leg

|}

Semifinals

|}

First leg

|}

Second leg

|}

Final

|}

Final standings

References

External links
 Official Website

CEV Women's Champions League
CEV Champions League
CEV Champions League